Ballona is a geographic place name in the Westside region of Los Angeles County, California.

Geographic place names:
 Ballona Creek
 Ballona Creek Bike Path
 Ballona Wetlands
 Ballona Lagoon
Historic places:
 Rancho La Ballona
 La Ballona station (1870s to 1890s)
 Port Ballona
School:
 La Ballona Elementary School, Culver City

Place name origin
The origin of the unique toponym Ballona is much disputed and possibly unknowable. Various theories have been exchanged for more than 150 years.

 1875: Misspelling of Ballena, Spanish word for whale (various dead whales did wash up near Ballona during the 19th century), or misspelling of Spanish “valle” meaning valley 
 1893: An introduction to Southern California in the Los Angeles Herald noted “Ballona, meaning and derivation unknown; not Spanish.”
 1939: “The origin of the word Ballona is in doubt.” Discounts whale theory; Cristobal Machado, an heir of the rancho family, suggests it’s somehow derivative of “bay”

Reference

Los Angeles County, California